Elian Ángel Valenzuela (born 5 April 2000), known professionally as L-Gante, is an Argentine rapper and cumbia singer and songwriter.

He rose to fame in 2021 following the release of his collaboration with Papu DJ, "L-Gante Rkt", and later gained mainstream popularity with the release of "Bzrp Music Sessions, Vol. 38", in collaboration with producer Bizarrap, which topped the Argentine Billboard Hot 100 chart.

Background
Valenzuela was born on 5 April 2000 in General Rodríguez, in the Greater Buenos Aires metropolitan area. He was raised by a single mother; he doesn't have any relationship with his father. He began to produce music at 15. His first songs were co-produced with close collaborator DT. Bilardo.

Before reaching success, Valenzuela worked at a plastic factory.

Musical career

Beginnings
Valenzuela's first release was uploaded to YouTube in 2017, but he wouldn't find much success until the following year, when his single "Uno más uno" attained over 2 million streams on Spotify. In December 2020, his collaboration with producer Papu DJ, "L-Gante RKT", debuted at 52 in the Argentine Billboard Hot 100, and peaked at second place in January 2021. The song is a mix of Argentine cumbia and reggaeton, and its lyrics detail clandestine parties in working-class barrios in times of COVID-19 restrictions.

In November 2020, he released "Pistola" alongside El Más Ladrón, produced by DT. Bilardo.

BZRP Music Session and widespread success
In early March 2021, producer Bizarrap announced L-Gante would be the next featured artist in his Music Sessions series. The release of the session was scheduled for 9 March, but in the early hours of that day, Valenzuela was detained in Rawson, San Juan Province under charges of causing public disturbances, and the release was delayed until Valenzuela could be cleared and released from custody. "L-Gante: Bzrp Music Sessions, Vol. 38" was released on Bizarrap's YouTube channel the following day, garnering over 3 million views in under 24 hours and trending at number 2. The collaboration topped the Billboard Hot 100, and remained at number 1 for seven consecutive weeks. On 30 March, L-Gante and La Joaqui released the single "Lassie".

In April 2021, Valenzuela released a remix of "Pistola" featuring cumbia band Damas Gratis. In May, he released two further singles: "Visionario" and "Internacional Love 420", featuring reggae singer Fidel Nadal. The same month, L-Gante was named "Artist of the Month" by Billboard Argentina, starring in the cover of the magazine's digital and physical editions.

In 2021, he collaborated with Dillom in his single "Tinty Nasty", and later featured in Dillom's debut album, Post Mortem.

Style and influences
Valenzuela has stated that he considers himself primarily a cumbia artist, with his particular style and brand being "Cumbia 420"; a mixture of cumbia and reggaeton, with marihuana playing a prominent role in the music's lyrics and themes. According to Valenzuela himself, his early incursions in music were motivated by his desire to make music in a style that was "more [Argentine]" and less influenced by foreign genres and trends. His music is also influenced by Latin trap.

Personal life
In 2022, Valenzuela became engaged to his girlfriend, Tamara Báez. In 2021, Valenzuela and Báez had a daughter, whom they named Jamaica.

Discography

Singles

References

External links
 L-Gante on Facebook
 L-Gante on Instagram

2000 births
Living people
Argentine rappers
Argentine trap musicians
Argentine reggaeton musicians
Cumbia musicians
Latin trap musicians
People from Buenos Aires Province